Carberry is a town in southwestern Manitoba, Canada. It is situated 3 kilometres south of the Trans-Canada Highway on Highway 5 in the Municipality of North Cypress – Langford, and has a population of 1,738 people.

Economy

Carberry and the surrounding rural area are known as "King Spud Country", a nickname which pays homage to the high quality potatoes grown in the area due to ideal soil conditions for the crop. Many businesses in Carberry offer services and supplies to support the robust agriculture industry. Food processing makes use of locally produced crops and is a major employer in the community. A local factory owned by McCain Foods makes various potato products, and is a major supplier for McDonald's Restaurants in Canada and the United States as well as producing potato products that are found in other well known restaurants, grocery stores and other varied world markets. It is one of the most highly advanced facilities of its kind in North America and normally operates 24 hours a day, 7 days a week.

Along with potatoes, the local agriculture industry is very diverse and includes other vegetable, grain, pulse, and industrial hemp crops as well as dairy, poultry and livestock, among other mixed farming.

Carberry's population increased by 4.1% between 2011 and 2016, due in part to the community's strong, stable economy along with other factors including its geographic location in relation to major transportation routes and the nearby city of Brandon.

The close proximity of Carberry to Spruce Woods Provincial Park and the many unique recreational activities in the area make Carberry a popular tourist destination. Many businesses and services cater to tourists both on a seasonal and year-round basis.

History

Early history

In the late 1760s, a small fur trading post called Pine Fort was established by independent fur traders from Montreal, south of Carberry's present site in what is now Spruce Woods Provincial Park along the Assiniboine River. At that time, a diverse group of Native peoples were travelling through the area and harvesting rich crops of beaver and other furs. Early fur trade accounts indicate that the Sioux from the south, resident Cree and Assiniboine, and eastern groups such as Saulteaux, Ottawa and various Ojibwa bands were all trading or hunting in the area. Pine Fort was later taken over by the North West Company, and was eventually abandoned in 1811.

Native people continued to pass through or reside in the Carberry area and did so until the late 1870s when European settlement began to affect the landscape and game resources. The Native population in the area was eventually settled onto reserves according to treaty provisions with the Federal Government of Canada.

Incorporation
The town of Carberry was officially founded in 1882. It was settled primarily by settlers coming from Eastern Canada who were of British origin, and was named after the Carberry Tower located near Musselburgh, Scotland.

Canadian Pacific Railway
As is the case with most towns in the southern districts of Western Canada, the present town of Carberry owes its origin mainly to the Canadian Pacific Railway. In 1882, the CPR established a station at De Winton, a now defunct town-site about 3.5 kilometres east of Carberry's present site. At the time, several CPR officials covertly purchased much of De Winton's town-site property, hoping for large personal profits as the new town grew around the new train station. This kind of speculation was strictly against the CPR's company rules, and on discovering the violation, the rail company decided to use 100 specially-hired men to physically move the train station to the present site of the town of Carberry. The extensive and secret operation was conducted in the middle of the night and was completed in less than 12 hours. When the station reached its new location, the town of Carberry was born. Carberry quickly grew into a prosperous town and was an important stop along the Canadian Pacific Railway. The CPR main line route runs through Carberry to this day, however the passenger train station has since been removed.

Trans Canada Highway
The Trans Canada Highway, another major national transportation route, was originally constructed on a routing that passed directly through the town of Carberry, which it did until the late 1950s when the route was changed according to plans for it to be upgraded to a 4-lane divided high-speed highway. Many businesses were established in Carberry to service the heavy traffic on the highway, many of which still exist. Today the Trans Canada Highway is located 3 km north of Carberry, and the old Trans Canada Highway route which passes directly through the town is known as Provincial Road 351 (within town limits it is known as 1st Avenue).

Military history

Camp Hughes
In 1909, a military training camp named "Camp Sewell" was established 10 kilometres west of Carberry along what is now PR 351 on the south side of the Canadian Pacific Railway line. The name of the camp was changed in 1915 to "Camp Hughes" in honour of Major-General Sir Sam Hughes, Canada's Minister of Militia and Defence at the time. The soldiers and support staff stationed at Camp Hughes naturally maintained very close social and economic ties with the town of Carberry which was only a short distance away.  Extensive trench systems, grenade and rifle ranges, and military structures were built at Camp Hughes between 1915 and 1916, and a variety of retail stores and entertainment complexes on a double-avenued area close to the main camp formed a lively commercial midway. During World War I, more than 38,000 troops of the Canadian Expeditionary Force trained at the camp, giving it the largest population in the province of Manitoba outside of the capital city, Winnipeg. Many of the soldiers who were trained at the camp were involved in the infamous Battle of Vimy Ridge. The military continued to train soldiers at Camp Hughes until 1934, when troops were moved to CFB Shilo and CFB Winnipeg for financial and logistical reasons. Camp Hughes has been designated as a Provincial Heritage Site, and although the site is no longer active, it is still monitored by the Canadian Department of National Defense.

There is a roadside park named "Camp Hughes Wayside Park" located 13 kilometres west of Carberry on the Trans Canada Highway near the west intersection with PR 351, a short distance north of the actual Camp Hughes site, named in honour of the military camp.

RCAF Station Carberry

In December, 1940, troops of the Royal Air Force arrived in Carberry and established the Service Flying Training School Number 33 just south of Carberry, known as RCAF Station Carberry. It was used to train military pilots in the vast British Commonwealth Air Training Plan. Thousands of military personnel from United Kingdom, Canada and other Commonwealth countries were moved to Carberry for flight training. The flight training school was disbanded at the end of World War II, and is now the present site of the McCain Foods processing facility.

Demographics 

Community 
 
Carberry & District Health Center
Carberry Hospital
Carberry Health Clinic
Dental Clinic
Laboratory and X-Ray
Personal Care Home
Home Care Services
Palliative Care Services
Public Health Services
Carberry Plains Community Centre
Bowling
Hockey
Figure Skating
Curling
Public Skating
Tennis
Swimming
Carberry Child Care Co-op
R.J. Waugh Elementary School (K-4)
Carberry Collegiate Institute (5–12)
Royal Canadian Mounted Police Carberry Detachment
Carberry/ North Cypress Fire Department
Manitoba Conservation Carberry District Office
Carberry/ North Cypress Library
Carberry Centennial Drop-In Centre/ Services for Seniors
Carberry Recreation Baseball Park
Royal Canadian Legion (branch 153)
Sandhills Golf & Country Club

Transportation

The Town of Carberry is located 3 kilometres south of the Trans Canada Highway on Highway 5,  50 kilometres east of Brandon, and 150 kilometres west of the provincial capital, Winnipeg.  The nearest 24-hour Canada-U.S.A. land border crossing is located 120 kilometres southwest of Carberry at Boissevain on Highway 10.

The town is situated 20 kilometres north of Spruce Woods Provincial Park, which is also located on Highway 5, designated in Manitoba as the Parks Route.

The Brandon Municipal Airport is located 48 kilometres west of Carberry. The Brandon Air Shuttle provides passenger service on request between Carberry and the Winnipeg James Armstrong Richardson International Airport.

Both the Canadian Pacific Railway main line route and a Canadian National Railway branch line route run directly through Carberry. Via Rail passenger service is not offered in Carberry, however trains on the Toronto to Vancouver "The Canadian" Line can be accessed at the Rivers railway station located approximately 80 kilometres northwest of the community, while the Winnipeg – Churchill train as well as The Canadian can be accessed at the Portage la Prairie railway station located approximately 80 kilometres east of the community.

Major attractions
The Seton Centre – a museum, art gallery & gift shop designed to celebrate the time that Ernest Thompson Seton spent in the Carberry area. A classroom and a garden featuring plants that are native to the prairies can be found behind the Centre.
Downtown Carberry (Main Street) – Designated as Manitoba's first Provincial Heritage District. Two entire blocks of the street are completely made up of historic buildings with architecture dating back well over a century.
Carberry Plains Museum – portrays life on the Manitoba prairies and the history of the Carberry area with various exhibits.
 Carberry Farmers Market Every Wednesday June to September 5 to 7 pm CPR Park South End of Main Street 
 Carberry Homecoming Street Festival yearly the last weekend of August
The Spirit Sands Desert is located within the park.
Camp Hughes, WWI trenches, National Historic Site west of Carberry
Sandhills Golf & Country Club – one of the longest nine-hole golf courses in Manitoba at a length of 2.95 kilometres (3228 yards).

Media

Carberry is home to the  Carberry News-Express – weekly newspaper and channel 12 television(WCG cable only) – WCG Community Access Channel.

Notable people

Richard Burton – actor - posted to Carberry as a Royal Air Force instructor during World War II.
Mary Carter (née Munn), one of the first female judges in Saskatchewan; part of childhood spent in Carberry.
Mitchell Grobb – musician
Bob Leslie – hockey coach and executive
Wilfrid Reid "Wop" May – pilot, World War One hero
Ernest Thompson Seton – author, artist, Woodcraft Indians founder, Boy Scouts of America founder
Joan Thomas, author

See also
List of communities in Manitoba

References

External links

Town of Carberry

Towns in Manitoba